Peter Schepull (born 7 June 1964) is a Swiss former professional footballer who played as a defender.

References

1964 births
Living people
Association football defenders
Swiss men's footballers
Grasshopper Club Zürich players
FC Wettingen players
Servette FC players
Swiss Super League players
Switzerland international footballers